Parasulenus is a genus of longhorn beetles of the subfamily Lamiinae, containing the following species:

 Parasulenus affinis Breuning, 1970
 Parasulenus lebisi Breuning, 1957
 Parasulenus unicolor Breuning, 1971
 Parasulenus viossati Breuning, 1970
 Parasulenus vittipennis Breuning, 1957

References

Desmiphorini